In electrical and safety engineering, hazardous locations (HazLoc, pronounced haz·lōk) are places where fire or explosion hazards may exist.  Sources of such hazards include gases, vapors, dust, fibers, and flyings, which are combustible or flammable.  Electrical equipment installed in such locations can provide an ignition source, due to electrical arcing, or high temperatures.  Standards and regulations exist to identify such locations, classify the hazards, and design equipment for safe use in such locations.

Overview

A light switch may cause a small, harmless spark when switched on or off.  In an ordinary household this is of no concern, but if a flammable atmosphere is present, the arc might start an explosion.  In many industrial, commercial, and scientific settings, the presence of such an atmosphere is a common, or at least commonly possible, occurrence.  Protecting against fire and explosion is of interest for both personnel safety as well as reliability reasons.

Several protection strategies exist.  The simplest is to minimize the amount of electrical equipment installed in a hazardous location, either by keeping the equipment out of the area altogether, or by making the area less hazardous (for example, by process changes, or ventilation with clean air).

When equipment must be placed in a hazardous location, it can be designed to reduce the risk of fire or explosion.  Intrinsic safety designs equipment to operate using minimal energy, insufficient to cause ignition.  Explosion-proofing designs equipment to contain ignition hazards, prevent entry of hazardous substances, and, contain any fire or explosion that could occur.

Different countries have approached the standardization and testing of equipment for hazardous areas in different ways.  Terminology for both hazards and protective measures can vary.  Documentation requirements likewise vary.  As world trade becomes more globalized, international standards are slowly converging, so that a wider range of acceptable techniques can be approved by national regulatory agencies.

The process of determining the type and size of hazardous locations is called classification.  Classification of locations, testing and listing of equipment, and inspection of installation, is typically overseen by governmental bodies.  For example, in the US by the Occupational Safety and Health Administration.

Standards

North America 

In the US, the independent National Fire Protection Association (NFPA) publishes several relevant standards, and they are often adopted by government agencies.  Guidance on assessment of hazards is given in NFPA497 (explosive gas) and NFPA499 (dust).  The American Petroleum Institute publishes analogous standards in RP500 andRP505.

NFPA 70, the National Electrical Code (NEC), defines area classification and installation principles.  NEC article 500 describes the NEC Division classification system, while articles 505 and 506 describe the NEC Zone classification system.  The NEC Zone system was created to harmonize with IEC classification system, and therefore reduce the complexity of management.

Canada has a similar system with CSA Group standard C22.1, the Canadian Electrical Code, which defines area classification and installation principles.  Two possible classifications are described, in Section 18 (Zones), and Appendix J (Divisions).

International Electrotechnical Commission 
 
The International Electrotechnical Commission publishes the 60079 series of standards which defines a system for classification of locations, as well as categorizing and testing of equipment designed for use in hazardous locations, known as "Ex equipment".  IEC 60079-10-1 covers classification of explosive gas atmospheres, and IEC 60079-10-2 explosive dust.  Equipment is placed into protection level categories according to manufacture method and suitability for different situations.  Unlike ATEX which uses numbers to define the safety "Category" of equipment, namely (1,2 3), the IEC continued to utilise the method used for defining the safe levels of intrinsic safety namely "a" for zone 0, "b" for zone 1 and "c" for zone 2 and apply this Equipment Level of Protection to all equipment for use in hazardous areas since 2009. <IEC 60079.14>

The IEC 60079 standard set has been adapted for use in Australia and New Zealand and is published as the AS/NZS 60079 standard set.

Hazards 

In an industrial plant, such as a refinery or chemical plant, handling of large quantities of flammable liquids and gases creates a risk of exposure.  Coal mines, grain mills, elevators, and similar facilities likewise present the risk of a clouds of dust.  In some cases, the hazardous atmosphere is present all the time, or for long periods.  In other cases, the atmosphere is normally non-hazardous, but a dangerous concentration can be reasonably foreseen—such as operator error or equipment failure.  Locations are thus classified by type and risk of release of gas, vapor, or dust.   Various regulations use terms such as class, division, zone, and group to differentiate the various hazards.

Often an area classification plan view is provided to identify equipment ratings  and installation techniques to be used for each classified area. The plan may contain the list of chemicals with their group and temperature rating.  The classification process requires the participation of operations, maintenance, safety, electrical and instrumentation professionals; and the use of process diagrams, material flows, safety data sheets, and other pertinent documents.  Area classification documentations are reviewed and updated to reflect process changes.

Explosive gas 

Typical gas hazards are from hydrocarbon compounds, but hydrogen and ammonia are also common industrial gases that are flammable.

Class I, Division 1 classified locations An area where ignitable concentrations of flammable gases, vapors or liquids can exist all of the time or some of the time under normal operating conditions. A Class I, Division 1 area encompasses the combination of Zone 0 and Zone 1 areas.

Zone 0 classified locations An area where ignitable concentrations of flammable gases, vapors or liquids are present continuously or for long periods of time under normal operating conditions. An example of this would be the vapor space above the liquid in the top of a tank or drum. The ANSI/NEC classification method consider this environment a Class I, Division 1 area. As a guide for Zone 0, this can be defined as over 1000 hours per year or less than 10% of the time.

Zone 1 classified location An area where ignitable concentrations of flammable gases, vapors or liquids are likely to exist under normal operating conditions. As a guide for Zone 1, this can be defined as 10–1000 hours per year or 0.1–10% of the time.

Class I, Division 2 or Zone 2 classified locations An area where ignitable concentrations of flammable gases, vapors or liquids are not likely to exist under normal operating conditions. In this area the gas, vapor or liquids would only be present under abnormal conditions (most often leaks under abnormal conditions). As a general guide for Zone 2, unwanted substances should only be present under 10 hours per year or 0–0.1% of the time.

Unclassified locations Also known as non-hazardous or ordinary locations, these locations are determined to be neither Class I, Division 1 or Division 2; Zone 0, Zone 1 or Zone 2; or any combination thereof. Such areas include a residence or office where the only risk of a release of explosive or flammable gas would be such things as the propellant in an aerosol spray. The only explosive or flammable liquids are paint and brush cleaner. These are designated as very low risk of causing an explosion and are more of a fire risk (although gas explosions in residential buildings do occur). Unclassified locations on chemical and other plant are present where it is absolutely certain that the hazardous gas is diluted to a concentration below 25% of its lower flammability limit (or lower explosive limit (LEL)).

Explosive dust 

Dust or other small particles suspended in air can explode.

NEC

United Kingdom 

An old British standard used letters to designate zones. This has been replaced by a European numerical system, as set out in directive 1999/92/EU implemented in the UK as the Dangerous Substances and Explosives Atmospheres Regulations 2002.

Gas and dust groups 

Different explosive atmospheres have chemical properties that affect the likelihood and severity of an explosion.  Such properties include flame temperature, minimum ignition energy, upper and lower explosive limits, and molecular weight.  Empirical testing is done to determine parameters such as the maximum experimental safe gap (MESG), minimum igniting current (MIC) ratio, explosion pressure and time to peak pressure, spontaneous ignition temperature, and maximum rate of pressure rise.  Every substance has a differing combination of properties but it is found that they can be ranked into similar ranges, simplifying the selection of equipment for hazardous areas.

Flammability of combustible liquids are defined by their flash-point. The flash-point is the temperature at which the material will generate sufficient quantity of vapor to form an ignitable mixture. The flash point determines if an area needs to be classified. A material may have a relatively low autoignition temperature yet if its flash-point is above the ambient temperature, then the area may not need to be classified. Conversely if the same material is heated and handled above its flash-point, the area must  be classified for proper electrical system design, as it will then form an ignitable mixture.

Each chemical gas or vapour used in industry is classified into a gas group.

Group IIC is the most severe zone system gas group.  Hazards in this group gas can be ignited very easily indeed. Equipment marked as suitable for Group IIC is also suitable for IIB and IIA. Equipment marked as suitable for IIB is also suitable for IIA but NOT for IIC. If equipment is marked, for example, Ex e II T4 then it is suitable for all subgroups IIA, IIB and IIC

A list must be drawn up of every explosive material that is on the refinery or chemical complex and included in the site plan of the classified areas. The above groups are formed in order of how explosive the material would be if it was ignited, with IIC being the most explosive zone system gas group and IIA being the least. The groups also indicate how much energy is required to ignite the material by energy or thermal effects, with IIA requiring the most energy and IIC the least for zone system gas groups.

Temperature 

Equipment should be tested to ensure that it does not exceed 80% of the autoignition temperature of the hazardous atmosphere.  Both external and internal temperatures are taken into consideration.  The autoignition temperature is the lowest temperature at which the substance will ignite without an additional heat or ignition source (at atmospheric pressure).  This temperature is used for classification for industry and technology applications.

The temperature classification on the electrical equipment label will be one of the following (in degree Celsius):

The above table shows that the surface temperature of a piece of electrical equipment with a temperature classification of T3 will not rise above 200 °C.  The surface of a high pressure steam pipe may be above the autoignition temperature of some fuel-air mixtures.

Equipment

General types and methods

Equipment can be designed or modified for safe operation in hazardous locations.  The two general approaches are:

Intrinsic safety Intrinsic safety, also called non-incendive, limits the energy present in a system, such that it is insufficient to ignite a hazardous atmosphere under any conditions.  This includes low both power levels, and low stored energy.  Common with instrumentation.

Explosion proof Explosion-proof or flame-proof equipment is sealed and rugged, such that it will not ignite a hazardous atmosphere, despite any sparks or explosion within.

Several techniques of flame-proofing exist, and they are often used in combination:

 The equipment housing may be sealed to prevent entry of flammable gas or dust into the interior.
 The housing may be strong enough to contain and cool any combustion gases produced internally.
 Enclosures can be pressurized with clean air or inert gas, displacing any hazardous substance.
 Arc-producing elements can be isolated from the atmosphere, by encapsulation in resin, immersion in oil, or similar.
 Heat-producing elements can be designed to limit their maximum temperature below the autoignition temperature of the material involved.
 Controls can be fitted to detect dangerous concentrations of hazardous gas, or failure of countermeasures.  Upon detection, appropriate action is automatically taken, such as removing power, or providing notification.

IEC 60079

Types of protection 

The types of protection are subdivided into several sub classes, linked to EPL: ma and mb, px, py and pz, ia, ib and ic.
The a subdivisions have the most stringent safety requirements, taking into account more than one independent component faults simultaneously.

Many items of EEx rated equipment will employ more than one method of protection in different components of the apparatus. These would be then labeled with each of the individual methods. For example, a socket outlet labeled EEx'de' might have a case made to EEx 'e' and switches that are made to EEx 'd'.

Equipment protection level (EPL) 

In recent years also the EPL is specified for several kinds of protection. The required protection level is linked to the intended use in the zones described below:

Equipment category 

The equipment category indicates the level of protection offered by the equipment.

 Category 1 equipment may be used in zone 0, zone 1 or zone 2 areas.
 Category 2 equipment may be used in zone 1 or zone 2 areas.
 Category 3 equipment may only be used in zone 2 areas.

NEMA enclosure types 

In the US, the National Electrical Manufacturers Association (NEMA) defines standards for enclosure types for a variety of applications.  Some of these are specifically for hazardous locations:

Labeling 

All equipment certified for use in hazardous areas must be labelled to show the type and level of protection applied.

Europe

In Europe the label must show the CE mark and the code number of the certifying/notified body).  The CE mark is complemented with the Ex mark: A yellow-filled hexagon with the Greek letters εχ (epsilon chi), followed by the Group, Category, and, if Group II, G or D (gas or dust). Specific types of protection being used will also be marked.

Industrial electrical equipment for hazardous area has to conform to appropriate parts of standard: IEC-60079 for gas hazards, and IEC-61241 for dust hazards.  In some cases, it must be certified as meeting that standard.  Independent test houses—Notified Bodies—are established in most European countries, and a certificate from any of these will be accepted across the EU.  In the United Kingdom, Sira and Baseefa are the most well known such bodies.

Australia and New Zealand use the same IEC-60079 standards (adopted as AS/NZS60079), however the CE mark is not required.

North America
In North America the suitability of equipment for the specific hazardous area must be tested by a Nationally Recognized Testing Laboratory, such as UL, FM Global, CSA Group, or Intertek (ETL).

The label will always list the class, division and may list the group and temperature code. Directly adjacent on the label one will find the mark of the listing agency.

Some manufacturers claim "suitability" or "built-to" hazardous areas in their technical literature, but in effect lack the testing agency's certification and thus unacceptable for the AHJ (Authority Having Jurisdiction) to permit operation of the electrical installation/system.

All equipment in Division 1 areas must have an approval label, but certain materials, such as rigid metallic conduit, does not have a specific label indicating the Cl./Div.1 suitability and their listing as approved method of installation in the NEC serves as the permission.  Some equipment in Division 2 areas do not require a specific label, such as standard 3 phase induction motors that do not contain normally arcing components.

Also included in the marking are the manufacturers name or trademark and address, the apparatus type, name and serial number, year of manufacture and any special conditions of use. The NEMA enclosure rating or IP code may also be indicated, but it is usually independent of the Classified Area suitability.

History

With the advent of electric power, electricity was introduced into coal mines for signaling, illumination, and motors.  This was accompanied by electrically-initiated explosions of flammable gas such as fire damp (methane) and suspended coal dust.

At least two British mine explosions were attributed to an electric bell signal system.  In this system, two bare wires were run along the length of a drift, and any miner desiring to signal the surface would momentarily touch the wires to each other or bridge the wires with a metal tool.  The inductance of the signal bell coils, combined with breaking of contacts by exposed metal surfaces, resulted in sparks, causing an explosion.

See also
Arc flash
ATEX directive
CompEx competency standard
Electrical conduit
Grounding kit
Intrinsic safety
Mineral-insulated copper-clad cable
Notified Body
Pressure piling

References

Further reading
 Alan McMillan, Electrical Installations in Hazardous Areas, Butterworth-Heineman 1998, 
 Peter Schram Electrical Installations in Hazardous Locations, Jones and Bartlett, 1997, 
 EEMUA, A Practitioner's Handbook for potentially explosive atmospheres, The Engineering Equipment and Materials Users Association, 2017, 

Electrical safety
Explosion protection
Natural gas safety